The Immaculate Conception Cathedral  also called Ürümqi Cathedral is a religious building located in the city of Ürümqi (Urumchi), capital of the Xinjiang Autonomous Region, in the northwest part of China.

The temple follows the Roman or Latin rite and is the mother and main church of the apostolic prefecture of Sinkiang (Praefectura Apostolica Sinkiangensis, 天主教新疆监牧区) which was created as a mission sui juris by the apostolic brief Decet Romanum Pontificem by the Pope Pius XI in 1930 and obtained its current status in 1938.

It is under the pastoral responsibility of Bishop Paul Xie Ting-zhe (謝庭哲).

See also
Roman Catholicism in China

References

Churches in Xinjiang
Roman Catholic cathedrals in China
Buildings and structures in Ürümqi